The Tengger Desert or Tengri Desert is an arid natural region that covers about 36,700 km2 and is mostly in the Inner Mongolia Autonomous Region in China.

The desert is expanding in size.

Environmental issues
The expansion of the Tengger and its neighbour, the Badain Jaran Desert, has been apparent since the 1950s, when large volumes of water were diverted from rivers to feed agricultural expansion and huge tracts of forest were removed. Since 1958, local governments have mobilised residents for afforestation campaigns to prevent the desert's spread. By 2004, the desert's expansion was estimated as 10 metres per year in some areas. In 2007, a non-profit organisation founded by residents of Minqin County created square ditches lined with hay and grass that they later planted with saxaul to stabilise the sand dunes. In 2010, the central and regional governments announced a five-year reforestation plan to create a 202-km green belt between the Tengger and Badain Jaran deserts. The project was estimated to receive 280 million yuan in funding and involve the relocation of 1,000 residents.

Features

See also
 Shapotou
 Alxa Left Banner

References

External links
 NASA imaging: Dust Storm in the Tengger Desert

Deserts of China
Geography of Inner Mongolia
Ergs
Geography of Ningxia
Tengriism